Salah Ali Al-Ghali has been the governor of South Darfur since 2001. He was or is a member of the Sudanese National Legislature.

He died in October 2015 and was given a state funeral.

References

Year of birth missing (living people)
Living people
People from South Darfur
Members of the National Legislature (Sudan)